WRSJ (1520 AM) is a radio station broadcasting an Adult Contemporary format. Licensed to San Juan, Puerto Rico, it serves the Puerto Rico area.  The station is currently owned by International Broadcasting Corporation.

On September 20, 2017, the station's transmitter site was heavily damaged by Hurricane Maria. One year later, The station returned to the air on December 11, 2018 as a simulcast of WQBS and the transmitter repairs are completed. On December 30, 2018 WRSJ rebrands as Activa 1520 AM and switched to a Spanish Tropical format. On May 11, 2020, the station switched to an Album Oriented Rock format and the current programming remains unchanged. On September 29, 2022, WRSJ switched to an Adult Contemporary format, rebranding itself as Romance 1520. Romance is still available on WZET 92.1 FM HD3 in the western region.

References

External links
FCC History Cards for WRSJ

RSJ
Radio stations established in 1950
RSJ
1950 establishments in Puerto Rico